Al-Kashf wa-l-bayān ʿan tafsīr al-Qurʾān, commonly known as the Tafsir al-Thalabi, is a classical Sunni tafsir, or commentary on the Quran, by eleventh-century Islamic scholar Ahmad ibn Muhammad al-Thalabi. It is composed of 10 volumes and it is over 3,425 pages.

Editions
 (single-volume edition)
 (10-volume edition)

See also
List of Sunni books

Tha'labi